In coding theory, the Gilbert–Varshamov bound (due to Edgar Gilbert and independently Rom Varshamov) is a limit on the parameters of a (not necessarily linear) code. It is occasionally known as the Gilbert–Shannon–Varshamov bound (or the GSV bound), but the name "Gilbert–Varshamov bound" is by far the most popular. Varshamov proved this bound by using the probabilistic method for linear codes. For more about that proof, see Gilbert–Varshamov bound for linear codes.

Statement of the bound
Let

denote the maximum possible size of a q-ary code  with length n and minimum Hamming distance d (a q-ary code is a code over the field  of q elements).

Then:

Proof
Let  be a code of length  and minimum Hamming distance  having maximal size:

Now each ball has size

Hence we deduce

That is:

An improvement in the prime power case
For q a prime power, one can improve the bound to  where k is the greatest integer for which

See also
Singleton bound
Hamming bound
Johnson bound
Plotkin bound
Griesmer bound
Grey–Rankin bound
Gilbert–Varshamov bound for linear codes
Elias-Bassalygo bound

References

Coding theory
Articles containing proofs